Independence is a home rule-class city in Kenton County, Kentucky, in the United States. It is one of its county's two seats of government. The population was 24,757 at the time of the 2010 U.S. census, up from 14,982 at the 2000 census. It is the third largest city in Northern Kentucky after Covington and Florence.

The current mayor of Independence is Chris Reinersman.

Geography
Independence is located in central Kenton County at  (38.953668, -84.546990). It is bordered to the northwest by Elsmere, to the north by Erlanger and Covington, and to the northeast by Ryland Heights. The western border of Independence follows the Boone County line, and the city of Florence in Boone County borders the far northwestern end of Independence.

The original center of Independence is in the southeast part of the city, along Madison Pike. Kentucky Route 17, a four-lane divided highway, passes just east of the city center, leading north  to downtown Covington and south  to Falmouth.

Banklick Creek, a northeast-flowing tributary of the Licking River, is the largest stream in the city, draining most of the area within the city limits.

History
The area post office was established by Isaac Everett in 1837 as "Everett's Creek"; in 1838, this was changed to "Crews Creek" (presumably after the present Cruises Creek that is south of the city); in 1839, Thomas Hordern renamed it "Bagby".

In 1840, Kenton was formed from Campbell and Boone counties. Local farmer John McCollum donated a site at the center of the new county to be its seat of governance, and the name "Independence" was chosen to honor the liberation of locals from Campbell County. The post office was renamed the same year. Quickly settled, Independence was formally incorporated by the state assembly in 1842.

Because the majority of the county's population resided along the Ohio River, Independence was eventually obliged to share its status as county seat with the larger city of Covington, a situation later repeated in Campbell County between the centrally-located Alexandria and the larger, riverside Newport.

Demographics

As of the census of 2000, there were 14,982 people, 5,181 households, and 4,149 families residing in the city. The racial makeup of the city was 97.20% White, 0.96% African American, 0.18% Native American, 0.40% Asian, 0.02% Pacific Islander, 0.36% from other races, and 0.87% from two or more races. Hispanic or Latino of any race were 1.15% of the population.

There were 5,181 households, out of which 44.9% had children under the age of 18 living with them, 62.9% were married couples living together, 12.1% had a female householder with no husband present, and 19.9% were non-families. 15.0% of all households were made up of individuals, and 3.4% had someone living alone who was 65 years of age or older. The average household size was 2.89 and the average family size was 3.21.

In the city, the population was spread out, with 30.4% under the age of 18, 9.2% from 18 to 24, 35.3% from 25 to 44, 18.5% from 45 to 64, and 6.5% who were 65 years of age or older. The median age was 31 years. For every 100 females, there were 101.6 males. For every 100 females age 18 and over, there were 97.3 males.

The median income for a household in the city was $51,002, and the median income for a family was $55,030. Males had a median income of $39,213 versus $26,807 for females. The per capita income for the city was $20,191. About 5.4% of families and 6.5% of the population were below the poverty line, including 9.2% of those under age 18 and 4.2% of those age 65 or over.

Economy
Major employers in Independence include Balluff, Cengage Learning, Krauss Maffei, Mazak, and Rotek.

Cultural

Independence is served by a branch of the Kenton County Public Library.

Schools
 Beechgrove Elementary School
 Community Christian Academy
 Kenton Elementary
 Simon Kenton High School
 St. Cecilia Catholic School
 Summit View Academy
Twenhofel Middle School
 Whites Tower Elementary
* Some members of the community are districted for Woodland Middle School and Scott High School as well.

Parks
 Lincoln Ridge Park
 Bowman Field
 Doe Run Lake
 Memorial Park
 Mills Road Park
 Pioneer Park
 Richardson Road Park
 Sterling Staggs Park

Fire
 Independence Fire District

Food 

 Wendy's
 McDonald's
 China King
 Skyline Chili
 Taco Bell
 United Dairy Farmers
 El Rio Grande
 Subway
 Buffalo Wild Wings
 Crewitts Creek
 Frisch's Big Boy

References

External links
 Official website
 Independence Fire District
 Historical Texts and Images of Independence, Kentucky
 41051.com - A community website for Independence, Kentucky

Cities in Kenton County, Kentucky
County seats in Kentucky
Populated places established in 1842
1842 establishments in Kentucky
Cities in Kentucky